= Adam-Pierre de La Grené =

Belgian dancer

Adam-Pierre de La Grené (1625–1702) was a dancer from the Spanish Netherlands.
